This list includes newspaper currently printed and circulating in South Australia. Circulation data has been sourced from the Audited Media Association of Australia in May 2016 (unless otherwise cited). Many of these newspapers are printed weekly or twice weekly.

References

South Australia
Newspapers published in South Australia